The 2011 ICC Cricket World Cup was the tenth Cricket World Cup. It was played in India, Sri Lanka, and for the first time in Bangladesh. India won the tournament, defeating Sri Lanka by 6 wickets in the final at Wankhede Stadium in Mumbai, thus becoming the first country to win the Cricket World Cup final on home soil. India's Yuvraj Singh was declared the man of the tournament. This was the first time in World Cup history that two Asian teams had appeared in the final. It was also the first time since the 1992 World Cup that the final match did not feature Australia.

Fourteen national cricket teams took part in this tournament, including 10 full members and four associate members of the International Cricket Council (ICC). The opening ceremony was held on 17 February 2011 at Bangabandhu National Stadium, Dhaka, and the tournament was played between 19 February and 2 April. The first match was played between India and Bangladesh at the Sher-e-Bangla National Stadium in Mirpur, Dhaka.

Pakistan was also scheduled to be a co-host, but after the 2009's terrorist attack on the Sri Lanka national cricket team in Lahore, the International Cricket Council (ICC) cancelled that, and the headquarters of the organising committee, originally in Lahore, was transferred to Mumbai. Pakistan was to have held 14 matches, including one semi-final. Eight of the games (including the semi-final) were awarded to India, four to Sri Lanka, and two to Bangladesh.

Host selection
The ICC announced on 30 April 2006 which countries would host the 2011 World Cup. Australia and New Zealand had also bid for the tournament; if successful, they would have shared the hosting equally, leaving the location of the final still to be decided. The Trans–Tasman bid, Beyond Boundaries, was the only one delivered to the ICC headquarters in Dubai before the 1 March deadline, but the Asian bidders were granted an extension by the ICC. The New Zealand government had given assurance that Zimbabwe would be allowed to compete in the tournament, following political discussions in the country over whether their cricket team should be allowed to tour Zimbabwe in 2005.

The extra time needed for the Asian bid had weakened its prospects, but when the time came to vote, Asia won the hosting rights by ten votes to three. The Pakistan Cricket Board (PCB) has revealed that the vote of the West Indies Cricket Board was decisive, as the Asian bid had the support of South Africa and Zimbabwe as well as the four bidding countries. The Pakistani newspaper Dawn reported that the Asian countries had promised to hold fund-raising events for West Indian cricket during the 2007 World Cup, which may have influenced the vote. However, I. S. Bindra, chairman of the Monitoring Committee of the Asian bid, said that their promise of extra profits of around US$400 million had been decisive, that there "was no quid pro quo for their support", and that playing the West Indies had "nothing to do with the World Cup bid".

Format
Late in 2007, the four host nations agreed on a revised format for the 2011 World Cup, identical to that of the 1996 World Cup, except that there would be 14 teams instead of 12. The first round of the tournament would consist of two groups of seven teams. Each team in a group would play all the others once, and the top four from each group would qualify for the quarter-finals. This ensured that every team would play at least six matches.

Qualification

As per ICC regulations, all 10 full members automatically qualify for the World Cup, including Zimbabwe who have given up their Test playing status until the standard of their team improves.

The ICC also organised a qualifying tournament in South Africa to determine the four Associate teams who would participate in the 2011 event. Ireland, who had been the best performing Associate nation since the last World Cup, won the tournament, beating Canada in the final. The Netherlands and Kenya also qualified by virtue of finishing third and fourth respectively. All 4 associates kept their ODI status as well as Scotland who this time failed to qualify for the World Cup.

List of qualified teams
The following 14 teams qualified for the final tournament.

Preparations

Pakistan loses co-host status
In April 2009 the ICC announced that Pakistan had lost its right to co-host the 2011 World Cup because of concerns about the "uncertain security situation" in the country, especially in the aftermath of the 2009 attack on the Sri Lanka national cricket team in Lahore. The PCB estimated that this would lose them $10.5 million. This figure took account only of the fees of $750,000 per match guaranteed by the ICC. The overall loss to the PCB and the Pakistani economy were expected to be much greater.

On 9 April 2009 PCB chairman Ijaz Butt revealed that they had issued a legal notice to oppose ICC's decision. The ICC, however, claimed that the PCB was still a co-host, and that they had only relocated the matches out of Pakistan. Pakistan proposed that South Asia host the 2015 World Cup and that Australia and New Zealand host the 2011 event, but this option did not find favour with their co-hosts and was not implemented.

Allocation of matches
On 11 April 2005 PCB chairman Shaharyar Khan announced an agreement on the allocation of games, under which India would host the final, Pakistan and Sri Lanka the semi-finals, and Bangladesh the opening ceremony. After being stripped of its status as a co-host, Pakistan proposed to host its allocated games in the United Arab Emirates as a neutral venue. They had played matches in Abu Dhabi, Dubai, and Sharjah in the preceding months. On 28 April 2009, however, the ICC announced that matches originally intended to be played in Pakistan would be reallocated. As a result, India hosted 29 matches across eight venues, including the final and one semi-final; Sri Lanka hosted 12 matches at three venues, including one semi-final; and Bangladesh hosted 8 matches at two grounds, as well as the opening ceremony on 17 February 2011.

On 1 June 2010 the first tranche of tickets were put on sale after a meeting of the tournament's Central Organising Committee in Mumbai. The cheapest tickets cost 20 US cents in Sri Lanka. In January 2011 the ICC declared the Eden Gardens ground in Kolkata, India, to be unfit and unlikely to be complete by 27 February, when it was scheduled to host a match between India and England. The match was moved to Bangalore.

Media and promotion

The World Cup has grown as a media event with each tournament. The ICC sold the broadcasting rights for the 2011 event to ESPN Star Sports and Star Cricket for around US$2 billion. For the first time, the tournament was broadcast in high-definition format, and it was to be covered by at least 27 cameras using recent technology. It was also planned to be shown across platforms such as online and mobile 3G. It was the first time that an ICC event had the Umpire Decision Review System (UDRS).

The final was watched live by 135 million people in India, as recorded by the ratings agencies TAM and aMap, including 67.6 million Indian cable and satellite viewers. The final was watched by 13.6% of Indian TV-equipped households on average, with a peak of 21.44% at the end of the game, thus beating the semi-final between India and Pakistan, which had an estimated 11.74% TV rating in India for the whole match.

The official event ambassador was Sachin Tendulkar.

Song

The official song of the 2011 Cricket World Cup has three versions, in Bengali, Hindi and Sinhala, corresponding to the three host countries. "De Ghuma Ke" (Swing It Hard) is the Hindi version, composed by the trio of Shankar–Ehsaan–Loy. It employs an array of Indian rhythms combined with elements of rock and hip hop. The Sinhala version, "Sinha Udaane", was adapted by Sri Lankan R&B and hip hop artist Ranidu Lankage and composed by lyricist Shehan Galahitiyawa. Both songs were performed at the opening ceremony. "Sinha Udaane" was performed by Lankage.

Mascot

Stumpy, a young elephant, was the official mascot for the 2011 Cricket World Cup. He was unveiled at a function in Colombo, Sri Lanka, on 2 April 2010, and his name was revealed on 2 August 2010 after an online competition conducted by the ICC in the last week of July.

Opening ceremony

The opening ceremony was held in the Bangabandhu National Stadium in Dhaka, Bangladesh, on 17 February 2011, two days before the first match.

Prize money
The 2011 Cricket World Cup winning team would be taking home a prize money of US$3 million and US$1.5 million for runner-up, with the International Cricket Council deciding to double the total allocation for the tournament to US$8.01 million. The winning team will also take home a replica of the ICC Cricket World Cup Trophy, that has been awarded since 1999. The decision was taken at the ICC Board meeting which was held in Dubai on 20 April 2010.
 US$250,000 – Losing quarter-finalists (4 teams)
 US$500,000 – Losing semi-finalists
 US$1,500,000 – Runners-up
 US$3,250,000 – Winners

Venues
All the Indian stadiums for the tournament had been finalised by mid-October 2009, and those of Bangladesh and Sri Lanka in late October 2009. The ICC announced all the venues in Mumbai on 2 November 2009. Two new stadiums were constructed in Kandy and Hambantota, Sri Lanka, for the event.

Umpires

The umpire selection panel selected 18 umpires excluding a reserve umpire, Enamul Haque (Bangladesh) to officiate at the World Cup: five from Australia, three from England, two each from India, New Zealand, Pakistan and Sri Lanka, and one each from South Africa and the West Indies.

Australia
  Simon Taufel
  Steve Davis
  Rod Tucker
  Daryl Harper
  Bruce Oxenford

New Zealand
  Billy Bowden
  Tony Hill

South Africa
  Marais Erasmus

Pakistan
  Aleem Dar
  Asad Rauf
India
  Shavir Tarapore
  Amiesh Saheba

England
  Ian Gould
  Richard Kettleborough
  Nigel Llong

Sri Lanka
  Asoka de Silva
  Kumar Dharmasena

West Indies
  Billy Doctrove

Squads

Each country chose a 30-member preliminary squad, which would then be reduced to 15. All the 14 teams announced their final squads before 19 January 2011.

Warm-up matches

The following 14 warm-up matches were played before the World Cup started. For statistical purposes, these matches are not considered to be One Day Internationals.

Group stage

Group A 

The top four teams from each group qualified for the quarter-finals (indicated in green).

Group B 

The top four teams from each group qualified for the Quarter finals (indicated in green).

Knockout stage

Quarter-finals

Semi-finals

Final

The final was played on 2 April between India and Sri Lanka at Wankhede Stadium, Mumbai. India were crowned champions after winning by six wickets with only 10 balls remaining. India captain MS Dhoni was named man of the match after an unbeaten, match-winning innings of 91 runs off 79 balls, including the final shot that won the game. Gautam Gambhir contributed with a crucial knock of 97 after India lost early wickets. After the match, the Indian players paid tribute to Sachin Tendulkar, who was playing in his last World Cup. The final had a viewership of about 558 million people all over the world.

Statistics

Controversies
 Bangladeshi fans threw rocks at the West Indies team bus as it returned players to their hotel after their win over Bangladesh in Dhaka on 4 March. It was later claimed that the rock-throwers had confused the bus with the Bangladesh team bus. The elite Rapid Action Battalion of Bangladesh arrested 38 people after the attack, and the West Indies later received an apology.
 The political party Shiv Sena threatened to disrupt the final in Mumbai if the Pakistani team qualified.
 During the group stage match between India and England, Ian Bell was given not out for leg before wicket despite the ball hitting him in line with the wickets and being on a path to hit the stumps. Dhoni later complained that the rule had deprived his side of what seemed like an obvious wicket. The rules were subsequently revised and the umpires were given new guidelines. The Sri Lankan captain, Kumar Sangakkara, later criticised the decision to alter the 2.5-metre rule while a tournament was in progress.
 In the final between India and Sri Lanka, loud crowd noise prevented match referee Jeff Crowe from hearing Sri Lankan captain Sangakkara's call as the coin was tossed by Indian captain Dhoni. The toss had to be redone – an extremely unusual event, especially at as prominent an event as the World Cup final.
In June 2020, it was alleged that the final match was fixed and Sri Lanka sold the match to India. Former Sri Lankan Sports Minister Mahindananda Aluthgamage said, "The 2011 Cricket World Cup final was fixed. I stand by what I say. It took place when I was the Minister of Sports." Earlier, former Sri Lankan captain Arjuna Ranatunga also claimed the final to be fixed and demanded a probe into the matter. However, in July 2020, the investigation was dropped, after no supporting evidence could be provided to verify the allegations. The ICC added that they did not have a reason to doubt the integrity of the tournament's final.

In media 

 Footage of the final match was purchased by makers and used in their film M.S. Dhoni: The Untold Story (2016). It was a Bollywood film based on Mahendra singh Dhoni.

References

External links 

 
 

 
2011 in Bangladeshi cricket
2011 in Indian cricket
2011 in Sri Lankan cricket
2011
International cricket competitions in 2010–11
International cricket competitions in Bangladesh
International cricket competitions in India
International cricket competitions in Sri Lanka
February 2011 sports events in Asia
March 2011 sports events in Asia
April 2011 sports events in Asia